The Kammer Canal, or Kammerkanal in German, is a canal in the German state of Mecklenburg-Vorpommern. It links the lakes of Woblitzsee and Zierker See, thus providing a navigable route between the River Havel, which flows through the Woblitzsee, and the town of Neustrelitz, which is on the Zierker See. 

It is administered as part of the Obere–Havel–Wasserstraße.

References

Canals in Germany
Transport in Mecklenburg-Western Pomerania
Federal waterways in Germany
Canals opened in 1843
1843 establishments in Prussia